Kaia Storvik (born 10 October 1976) is a Norwegian journalist, former newspaper editor and politician. She has worked for several newspapers, including Vårt Land, Dagbladet, Dagens Næringsliv and Dagsavisen. She was chief editor of Dagsavisen from 2010 to 2014.

References

1976 births
Living people
Norwegian newspaper editors
Norwegian women editors
Norwegian journalists
Norwegian women journalists
Red Party (Norway) politicians
Dagsavisen editors